The Soko 522 was a two-seater Yugoslav military training and light attack aircraft produced in the 1950s by SOKO in Yugoslavia.

History
The Soko 522 was designed by Yugoslav engineers Šostarić, Marjanović and Čurčić at the Ikarus Aircraft Factory in Zemun. The first prototype flew in February 1955. After the initial success of the new aircraft, production was transferred to the Soko aircraft factory in Mostar. Production lasted until 1961 and totalled 110 units. It was used as the primary trainer aircraft for the Yugoslav air force until it was retired in 1978.

It gained some fame for its role in war movies filmed in Yugoslavia during the 1960s and 1970s, where it was used to portray the Fw 190 German fighter. Some of its prominent movie roles were in the Yugoslav Oscar candidate Battle of Neretva and Kelly's Heroes, starring Clint Eastwood.

Operators

Yugoslav Air Force
460th Light Combat Aviation Squadron (1961–1967)
461st Light Combat Aviation Squadron (1961–1968, 1973–1977)
462nd Light Combat Aviation Squadron (1961–1968, 1973–1977)
463rd Light Combat Aviation Squadron (1961–1966)
464th Light Combat Aviation Squadron (1961–1966)
465th Light Combat Aviation Squadron (1961–1966)

Surviving aircraft

France
 60168 – Soko 522 airworthy.

Serbia
 60132 – Soko 522 on static display at the Museum of Aviation in Belgrade.
 60157 – Soko 522 on static display at the Museum of Aviation in Belgrade.
 60204 – Soko 522 on static display at the Museum of Aviation in Belgrade.

Bosnia and Herzegovina
 60143 – Soko 522 on static display at Mostar Airport in Mostar, Herzegovina-Neretva.

Slovenia
 Soko 522 on static display at the Pivka Park of Military History in Pivka.

United States
 Soko 522 owned by John Magoffin in Tucson, Arizona. It was damaged in a wheels up landing.

Specifications (Soko 522)

See also

References

Notes

Bibliography

 Taylor, John W. R. Jane's All The World's Aircraft 1961–62. London: Sampson Low, Marston & Company, 1961.
Illustrated history of aviation ’’Modern Ikars“, IRO Vuk Karadzic&Sluzbeni list SFRJ, Belgrade, 1989. 
Yugoslavian Air Force and Air Defence, group of authors, VINC, Belgrade, 1989.

522
Ikarus aircraft
1950s Yugoslav military trainer aircraft
Low-wing aircraft
Single-engined tractor aircraft
Aircraft first flown in 1955